Marina Rossell i Figueras (born 17 January 1954 in Castellet i la Gornal,) is a Spanish singer in Catalan and Spanish.

She's one of the most important singers in the modern Catalan language. She has sung traditional and revolutionary classical Catalan songs, habaneras and her own compositions.

Rossell has collaborated with such diverse artists as:Lluís Llach Georges Moustaki, Montserrat Caballé, Luis Eduardo Aute, Pedro Guerra or the flamenco guitarist Tomatito. She has made numerous tours by Europe, Latin America, northern Africa.

Partial discography
Penyora, 1978
Cos meu recorda, 1982
Barca del temps, 1985
Cinema blau, 1990
Marina, 1993
Ha llovido, 1996
Entre linies, 1997
Y rodará el mundo, 2000
Cap al cell, 2002
Maritim, 2003
Nadal, 2005
Vistas al mar, 2006
Sinfonía de mujeres (with Cristina del Valle and Rim Banna), 2007
Clàssics catalans, 2007
Marina Rossell al Liceu, DVD, 2008
Inicis 1977-1990, 2011
Marina Rossell canta Moustaki, 2011

References

External links
Website

1954 births
Living people
Spanish women singers
Catalan-language singers
Musicians from Catalonia
Catalan Anti-Francoists